The 2011 GEKO Ypres Rally, was the fifth round of the 2011 Intercontinental Rally Challenge and fourth round of the 2011 European Rally Championship. The event was held between 23–25 June 2011, and was based in the town of Ypres in Belgium.

Introduction
The rally was held over two days with a total of  covered in eighteen asphalt special stages. Friday had six stages with Saturday having a total of twelve stages. In addition to IRC frontrunners Bryan Bouffier, Jan Kopecký and Thierry Neuville, other entries in S2000 cars included Freddy Loix (Škoda Fabia S2000), Abarth driver Luca Rossetti and factory Proton pair, Giandomenico Basso and Per-Gunnar Andersson. Kopecký failed to start the event however, after a crash in shakedown that caused an injury to his co-driver, Petr Starý.

Results
Freddy Loix won the event for the seventh time, having led from start to finish.

Overall

Special stages

References

External links 
 The official website for the rally
 The official website of the Intercontinental Rally Challenge

Ypres
Ypres
Ypres Rally